Rusmir Cviko (born 2 January 1972) is a Bosnian professional football manager and former player.

Cviko is a former player of the Bosnia and Herzegovina national football team and coach of numerous national teams of Bosnia and Herzegovina.

Club career
Cviko started his youth playing career at Sarajevo. After finishing his youth career, he played for the senior team of Sarajevo 1993. In 1995, he moved to Belgian First Division A club Royal Antwerp where he played until 1997 but did not feature in any league game.

In 1997, Cviko came back to Bosnia and Herzegovina, and moved to First League of Bosnia and Herzegovina club Željezničar, where he won the league title in the 1997–98 season and the Bosnian Supercup in 1998. In 1999, Cviko moved to Čelik Zenica, before ending his career at UAE Pro-League club Al Wahda in 2000.

International career
Between 1993 and 1996, Cviko played for the Bosnia and Herzegovina national team.
During his youth national team playing career Cviko played for the U15, U17 and U19 national teams of Bosnia and Herzegovina.

Managerial career

Bosnia and Herzegovina national teams
From 2004 until 2008, Cviko was a youth National Team coach in the  FA of Bosnia and Herzegovina. In 2007, he became one of the coaches of the U21 National Team of Bosnia and Herzegovina. He remained in that position until 2009.

During his tenure at the Bosnian FA, he also served as the head scout of the A National Team of Bosnia and Herzegovina. In 2014, Cviko held the position of coach and scout with the youth National Team in the FA.

Željezničar (team manager)
In 2009, Cviko accepted the position of team manager at the Bosnian powerhouse Željezničar on suggestion of club manager at the time Amar Osim. During Cviko's tenure as team manager, the Željezničar team coached by Osim had much success. The club was crowned Champions in the seasons 2009–10, 2011–12 and 2012–13.

Željezničar also won 2 Bosnian cup titles in the 2010–11 and 2011–12 seasons. In the 2009–10 and the 2012–13 seasons, the club was the runner-up in the National Cup competition. Cviko finished his tenure at the club after leaving in June 2013.

Dalian Transcendence
On 21 April 2016, Cviko began to work as the manager of Dalian Transcendence. In August 2016, Cviko was named interim-manager of the team, and he successfully saved the team from relegation.

On 18 December 2016, Dalian Transcendence officially signed Cviko as their manager. He took the club over when it was in danger of relegation and kept it in China League One. In the next season, Cviko ended his time at Dalian Transcendence and upon his departure the club was in 9th position. He completed his tenure at Dalian in December 2017.

Meizhou Hakka
Cviko's great reputation and great work in Dalian Transcendence did not go unnoticed and on 16 December 2017, he became the new manager of China League One club Meizhou Hakka F.C. Cviko took the team into the new season in January 2018. In the 2018 China League One season, he managed to get the club to its highest position in history. In April 2018, he was declared as the Coach of the Month in the China League One.

Only in April 2018, Meizhou Hakka  won 5 games in China League One which was hailed as a phenomenal success as the club's goal at the beginning of the season was to avoid relegation. The club's league position lead it in the next season to the China Super League and that had attracted a lot of attention from some Chinese Super League clubs for Cviko.

He resigned from the position of Meizhou Hakka manager on 28 August 2018, but left the club at friendly terms with its management.
While at Hakka, Cviko once again proved what a great hire he was for the club. When he took over the team in December 2017, the club's first team was ranked 13th out of 16 teams in the China League One based on team value. At the time of Cviko's departure the team was ranked 3rd out of 16 teams. This was due to the team's great results throughout the season and the fact that during Cviko's tenure at the club, the team spent most of its time ranked somewhere between the 1st and 3rd place in the China League One rankings.

Cviko also broke some records as well while at the club. The team was unbeaten for 11 games in a row on its home field and won 5 in a row which is the club's best result in history.

Return to Bosnia and Herzegovina national team
On 25 January 2020, Cviko returned to the Bosnia and Herzegovina national team, being named as an assistant of head coach Dušan Bajević.

Honours

Player
Željezničar 
First League of Bosnia and Herzegovina: 1997–98
Bosnian Supercup: 1998

Manager
Individual 
China League One Manager of the Month: April 2018

References

External links
Rusmir Cviko at Soccerway
Rusmir Cviko Interview

1972 births
Living people
Footballers from Sarajevo
Association football midfielders
Yugoslav footballers
Bosnia and Herzegovina footballers
FK Sarajevo players
Royal Antwerp F.C. players
FK Željezničar Sarajevo players
NK Čelik Zenica players
Al Wahda FC players
Premier League of Bosnia and Herzegovina players
UAE Pro League players
Bosnia and Herzegovina expatriate footballers
Expatriate footballers in Belgium
Bosnia and Herzegovina expatriate sportspeople in Belgium
Expatriate footballers in the United Arab Emirates
Bosnia and Herzegovina expatriate sportspeople in the United Arab Emirates
Bosnia and Herzegovina football managers
Dalian Transcendence F.C. managers
Meizhou Hakka F.C. managers
China League One managers
Bosnia and Herzegovina expatriate football managers
Expatriate football managers in China
Bosnia and Herzegovina expatriate sportspeople in China
Al-Arabi SC (Kuwait) managers
Kuwait Premier League managers
Expatriate football managers in Kuwait
Bosnia and Herzegovina expatriate sportspeople in Kuwait